Command Performance is a 1931 American pre-Code drama film directed by Walter Lang.

Cast
 Neil Hamilton as Peter Fedor/Prince Alexis
 Una Merkel as Princess Katerina
 Helen Ware as Queen Elinor
 Albert Gran as King Nicholas
 Lawrence Grant as Count Vellenburg
 Thelma Todd as Lydia
 Vera Lewis as Queen Elizabeth
 Mischa Auer as Duke Charles
 Burr McIntosh as Masoch
 Wilhelm von Brincken as Capt. Boyer
 Murdock MacQuarrie as Blondel

References

External links
 

1931 films
1931 drama films
American drama films
American black-and-white films
Films directed by Walter Lang
Films set in Europe
Tiffany Pictures films
1930s English-language films
1930s American films